Movement of Young Marxist–Leninists was a radical Marxist-Leninist group in Senegal, founded by Landing Savané in 1970. MJML was the continuation of Democratic Youth.

MJML was short-lived. The brothers Blondin Diop split from it and created the Committee for the Initiative for Permanent Revolutionary Action. Landing would later form the group Reenu-Rew in 1973.

Source: Zuccarelli, François. La vie politique sénégalaise (1940-1988). Paris: CHEAM, 1988.

Political parties established in 1970
Communist parties in Senegal